Renee Metivier Baillie (born December 25, 1981 in Highland Village, Texas) is an American long-distance runner who competed at multiple IAAF World Cross Country Championships and finished eighth at the 2012 Chicago Marathon.

High school and college career
In high school, Metivier Baillie was a three-time state champion.

In college, she was an 11-time All-American for the University of Colorado and Georgia Tech.

Elite career
In 2010, Metivier Baillie won the 3000 meters at the USA Indoor Track and Field Championships, but did not compete in the world championships that year.

In 2012, Metivier Baillie won the US 20K championship and finished eighth at the 2012 Chicago Marathon.

In 2016, Metivier Baillie won the US Half marathon trail championship at Lake Padden Trail Half Marathon in Bellingham, Washington.

In 2020, during the COVID-19 lockdown, Metivier broke several treadmill world records during the Chaski Challenge. En route to her 50 km world record of 3:11:42, she set records at the marathon, 2:40:55, and half-marathon, 1:19:29, distances. The old treadmill 50 km record was 3:51:25. The half-marathon record was short-lived, as only a few hours later Sara Hall lowered the mark to 1:09:03.

World Cross Country Championships Competition record
2010: 38th (senior race)
2008: 49th (senior race)
2007: 36th (senior race)
2006: 49th (long race)
2005: 42nd (long race)

Sponsorship
Metivier Baillie has been sponsored by Nike and Mizuno.

References

External links

Living people
1981 births
American female long-distance runners
American female marathon runners
Colorado Buffaloes women's track and field athletes
Georgia Tech Yellow Jackets women's track and field athletes
Sportspeople from the Dallas–Fort Worth metroplex
Georgia Tech Yellow Jackets women's cross country runners
Colorado Buffaloes women's cross country runners
USA Indoor Track and Field Championships winners
21st-century American women